Minimax is a strategy in decision theory and related disciplines.

Minimax, minmax, or min-max can also refer to:

Mathematics
 Minimax estimator, an estimator which maximal risk is minimal between all possible estimators 
 Minimax approximation algorithm, algorithms to approximate a function
 The Courant minimax principle, a characterization of the eigenvalues of a real symmetric matrix
 Minimax theorem, one of a number of theorems relating to the max-min inequality
 The Min-max theorem, a characterization of eigenvalues of compact Hermitian operators on Hilbert spaces
 Minimax Condorcet method, one of the Condorcet compliant electoral systems.
 God's number, the minimum number of moves required to solve a puzzle at its maximum complexity
 Yao's principle, regarding the expected cost of algorithms
 The fundamental max–min inequality of real analysis
 Saddle point, also known as the minimax point

Other
 Minimax (TV channel), a television channel available in Central and Eastern Europe (not to be confused with the Pakistani television channel)
 Disney XD (Spanish TV channel), formerly known as Minimax
 Teletoon+, a Polish television channel formerly known as Minimax
 Min-maxing, a role-playing or wargame strategy
 'mini-maxing', a strategy in the board game Hex
 Mini-MAX, a family of ultralight aircraft
 Minimax Limited, a manufacturer of fire extinguishers
 miniMAX Discount, defunct Romanian supermarket chain
 Minimax, a cooking approach promoted by celebrity chef Graham Kerr in the 1980s and 1990s
 Frosted Mini-Wheats, a cereal made by Kellogg's known as Mini Max in the UK
Mini-Max, a character in Disney's Big Hero 6: The Series